Chromosome 18 is one of the 23 pairs of chromosomes in humans. People normally have two copies of this chromosome. Chromosome 18 spans about 80 million base pairs (the building material of DNA) and represents about 2.5 percent of the total DNA in cells.

Genes

Number of genes 
The following are some of the gene count estimates of human chromosome 18. Because researchers use different approaches to genome annotation their predictions of the number of genes on each chromosome varies (for technical details, see gene prediction). Among various projects, the collaborative consensus coding sequence project (CCDS) takes an extremely conservative strategy. So CCDS's gene number prediction represents a lower bound on the total number of human protein-coding genes.

Gene list 

The following is a partial list of genes on human chromosome 18. For complete list, see the link in the infobox on the right.

Diseases and disorders
The following diseases are some of those related to genes on chromosome 18:
 Erythropoietic protoporphyria
 Hereditary hemorrhagic telangiectasia
Niemann–Pick disease type C
 Porphyria
Selective mutism
 Edwards syndrome (trisomy 18)
 Tetrasomy 18p
 Monosomy 18p
Pitt–Hopkins syndrome 18q21
 Distal 18q- (distal deletion)
 Proximal 18q- (proximal deletion)

Cytogenetic band

References

External links

 Chromosome18.org
 Chromosome18 Registry And Research Society in Europe.
 
 

Chromosomes (human)